The European Community Reference Laboratory for Fish Diseases is located in Frederiksberg, Denmark at the National Veterinary Institute (a part of Technical University of Denmark).  It is funded by the European Commission.

References

External links
 

agencies of the European Union
animal health organizations